George Alfred Joulwan (born November 16, 1939, Pottsville, Pennsylvania) is a retired United States Army general who served for 36 years. He finished his military career as the Commander-in-Chief of the United States European Command and NATO's Supreme Allied Commander (SACEUR) in 1997.

As the Supreme Allied Commander, he conducted over 20 operations in the Balkans, Africa, and the Middle East. When the United States sent forces into Bosnia in the 1990s, General Joulwan played the leading role in troop deployment, earning praise by President Clinton upon Joulwan's retirement.

As SACEUR, General Joulwan created a strategic policy for the United States military engagement in Africa, which was the first time in U.S. history that such a policy had been crafted.

Military career

West Point 
George Joulwan earned his college degree at the United States Military Academy at West Point. At West Point, he played football and basketball, earning two varsity letters as a football lineman. Later in his career, General Joulwan earned a master's degree from Loyola University (Chicago) in political science.

Vietnam 
General Joulwan served from June 1966 to November 1967 and from June 1971 to January 1972 in Vietnam. He attended the Army War College, and served on the Staff and Faculty until 1979. He commanded the 2nd Brigade, 3rd Infantry Division (Mechanized), from June 1979 to September 1981, when he became Chief of Staff, 3rd Infantry Division.

White House 

Joulwan served as special assistant to General Alexander Haig while still a Major within the U.S. Army, when Haig was serving as White House Chief of Staff from May 4, 1973 – September 21, 1974.

National leadership 
He served in various functions at the Pentagon from 1982 until June 1986, when he became the Deputy Chief of Staff for Operations, United States Army Europe and U.S. Seventh Army, Germany.

In March 1988 he was given command of the 3rd Armored Division and in 1989 he became Commanding General, U.S. V Corps.

From November 1990 until October 1993 he was Commander in Chief of United States Southern Command.

International leadership 
He served as the Supreme Allied Commander, Europe (SACEUR) from 1993 to 1997, when he was succeeded by General Wesley Clark. He retired from command after serving in NATO.

Post-military career 
General Joulwan sits on the board of directors of Emergent BioSolutions, a biotechnology company, after a referral to the post by Allen Shofe, an executive at Emergent.

His other post-military positions have included:

 President of Team One, a consulting firm
 Senior Advisor of Global USA Inc, a government relations and consulting firm
 Board member for General Dynamics Corporation
 Professor at the United States Military Academy at West Point 
 Member of the Board of Trustees for the United States Military Academy
He has also served as a military analyst for Fox News Channel. Notably, he appeared on Fox News Sunday a few weeks after September 11, 2001, with White House Chief of Staff Andrew Card and Senate Armed Forces chairman Carl Levin to discuss his experience in war planning and the American military's planning with regards to Afghanistan.

Citizenship and philanthropy 
General Joulwan has also served the St. Jude Children's Research Hospital as the Chair Emeritus of the Gourmet Gala Committee. A public park in Pottsville, Pennsylvania was named in his honor.

Personal life 
General Joulwan had a twin brother, James Joseph Joulwan, who died in 2013. General Joulwan is of Lebanese heritage. He is married and has eight grandchildren. George comes from a distinguished military family. His father fought with the US Navy in WWI, and his cousin fought with the US ARMY in WWII and was captured twice.

Awards and decorations

References

External links

 Biography at United States Military Academy
 George Joulwan historical news archives at The New York Times
 Profile at Forbes
 The General George Joulwan East Side Park in Pottsville, Pennsylvania
 "The New NATO: Building Stability, Democracy, and Peace Through Cooperation" article by General Joulwan at the Center for Strategic Decision Research

Atlantic Council
1939 births
Living people
People from Pottsville, Pennsylvania
American people of Lebanese descent
United States Army personnel of the Vietnam War
United States Army generals
General Dynamics
Recipients of the Distinguished Service Medal (US Army)
Recipients of the Silver Star
Recipients of the Legion of Merit
Recipients of the Gallantry Cross (Vietnam)
Knights Commander of the Order of Merit of the Federal Republic of Germany
NATO Supreme Allied Commanders
Recipients of the Air Medal
Recipients of the Order of the White Lion
United States Army War College alumni
Recipients of the Defense Distinguished Service Medal
Military personnel from Pennsylvania